Exceedra Software, formally known as Cube Software, is an integrated business planning and analytics software company aimed specifically at the Consumer Product Goods manufacturers, retailers and suppliers to help manage, access, analyse and report on data. The company is headquartered in London UK with offices located in Marlow Buckinghamshire; Charlotte North Carolina, United States, and Melbourne, Australia.

With history from 1987, the company has been listed in The Guardian newspaper's Top Tech 100 list in 2011, and The Telegraph Newspaper Start Up 100 list, also in 2011. 2016 Readers' Choice Survey: Supply Chain Planning award was also won.

History
Exceedra first introduced Procast, a demand forecasting application as part of a joint venture with Unilever in 1986. The product became commercially available the following year, and is now available internationally across many global companies in the retail, consumer goods, manufacturing, wholesale distribution and pharmaceutical sectors.

In 2009, Exceedra developed ActNow, a demand sensing application that adds intelligence to demand planning software.

In 2010, Exceedra became a Microsoft BizSpark One Company 

In 2010, it changed the name of Procast to Sales Planner and Demand Planner.

Since 2013 the company has expanded globally, opening offices in the US and Australia

In 2013 Exceedra was placed 8th in the Cloudex 20:20—a listing of the top 20 UK independent cloud computing companies

In 2014 Exceedra were recognized by Gartner in its inclusion in its report “Vendor Panorama for Trade Promotion Management in Consumer Goods, 2014” “Exceedra will become a global player in the next 12-24 months.”

In 2015 Exceedra was listed in the Top 10 Technology Providers for Trade Promotion Management and leader of the SMB category in Consumer Goods Technology (CGT) Readers’ Choice 2015 awards

In 2019, Exceedra merged with AFS. The combined company will run as a subsidiary of AFS Technologies under the Exceedra name.

See also
 Sales and operations planning
 Integrated Business Planning
 Trade Promotion Management

References

External links
Exceedra Official Website

Software companies of the United Kingdom